The Philippine Reporter is an online and paper print media outlet based in Toronto, Ontario, Canada that has been publishing since March 1989. It carries Philippine news and community news and feature stories about Filipinos in Philippines, Canada, and the U.S. The Philippine Reporter is widely read in the Greater Toronto Area and is usually distributed in Filipino Canadian stores.

See also
List of newspapers in Canada

Awards
2003 “Best Editorial and Design Award” by National Ethnic Press and Media of Council Canada
2009 “Best Editorial and Visual Presentation” award from National Ethnic Press and Media Council of Canada through Prime Minister Stephen Harper on Nov. 21, 2009

External links
Philippine Reporter

Asian-Canadian culture in Toronto
Filipino-Canadian culture
Multicultural and ethnic newspapers published in Canada
Newspapers established in 1989